Hechicero / Rey Hechicero (born in Monterrey, Nuevo León, Mexico) is a Mexican luchador enmascarado (or masked professional wrestler), who works for Consejo Mundial de Lucha Libre (CMLL), where he a former CMLL World Heavyweight Champion. He portrays a rudo ("Bad guy") wrestling character. Hechicero has also made appearances on the Mexican independent circuit, as well as in Japan for New Japan Pro-Wrestling (NJPW) and in the United States for Ring of Honor (ROH).

Hechicero's real name is not a matter of public record, as is often the case with masked wrestlers in Mexico where their private lives are kept a secret from the wrestling fans. He is billed as "Rey Hechicero" when making appearances outside CMLL, but there is no pretense that it is two different characters that he is playing. Hechicero is Spanish for "Wizard" and "Rey Hechicero" means "Wizard King".

Professional wrestling career
In lucha libre there is a long-standing tradition of keeping the personal information of masked wrestlers private from the public, including wrestling promotions not revealing their real names and news outlets not asking for personal details in interviews. Because of this tradition the real name of the wrestler known under the ring names Rey Hechicero and Hechicero is not public knowledge, nor has the year of his birth been established, Hechicero himself has stated that he made his debut, on February 15, 2001, referring to it as "Hechicero's" birthday. Hechicero resides in Monterrey, Nuevo León, Mexico but it has not been confirmed if this is also his birthplace. During interviews he revealed that he had been trained by a number of Monterrey local wrestlers both before making his debut and after such as Arcángel, Cachorrro Zapata, Chucho Villa, Garringo, Mario Segura, Pequeño Diamante and Katsuyori Shibata.

Mexican independent circuit (2001–present)
Rey Hechicero made his debut on February 15, 2001, in his home town of Monterrey, Nuevo León working for a local wrestling promotion. In 2004, he was listed as having worked a number of matches for the Naucalpan, State of Mexico based International Wrestling Revolution Group (IWRG) but did not tour extensively outside Nuevo León. In 2007, Rey Hechicero became involved in a storyline feud against another local Monterrey wrestler called Gitano del Norte ("The Gypsy of the North"), a storyline that led to both men putting their masks on the line on the outcome of a Lucha de Apuestas ("Bet match"). Rey Hechicero won and forced his opponent to unmask, which in Lucha Libre is considered more prestigious than winning championships. He capped 2007 by defeating Tigre Universitario to win the WWA World Middleweight Championship Defeating Tigre Universitario for the championship was part of a long running storyline between the two, a storyline that would see both of them involved in a four-man Lucha de Apuesta on March 23, 2008. Both Rey Hechicero and Tigre Universitario escaped from the match with their masks while Valiente pinned Sergio Romo, Jr. to force Romo to be shaved bald after the match since he was not masked.

In late 2008 Rey Hechicero was scheduled to team up with Último Guerrero for a Ruleta de la muerte ("Roulette of death") tournament where the losers of the match advance and the losing team have to fight each other for their masks. Rey Hechicero suffered an injury shortly before the tournament and had to be replaced by Difunto II. There was no verification if Rey Hechicero had indeed been injured or if the replacement took place because whoever had originally agreed to lose his mask changed his mind and Difunto II agreed to lose his match. Also in 2008 Rey Hechicero began working for a local promotion called Poder Y Honor ("Power and Honor"; PYH) and in 2009 he outlasted Chucho Mar Jr., Estrella Dorada Jr. and Tigre Universitario to become the inaugural PYH Heavyweight Champion. In the following years he worked for a number of wrestling promotions as they toured through Monterrey, including winning the mask of Caifán Rockero I on a Perros del Mal show in March 2010. While he began working for Consejo Mundial de Lucha Libre ("World Wrestling Council"; CMLL) in 2014, he was also allowed to work for various local promotions by CMLL. On December 25, 2014 Rey Hechicero unsuccessfully challenged Black Terry for the FLLM Master Championship on a Cara Lucha show in Ciudad Nezahualcoyotl.

Consejo Mundial de Lucha Libre (2014–present)
In early 2014 Rey Hechicero was introduced as part of CMLL's Generacion 2014 class, alongside seven other wrestlers making their CMLL debut around the same time. His name was shortened to simply "Hechicero", possibly because CMLL already had someone working as Rey Bucanero, Rey Escorpión, and Rey Cometa and wanted to reduce the possible confusion. Hechicero was the only member of Generacion 2014 who was not a related to someone working for CMLL or a second-generation wrestler, and he and Espiritu Negro were notably older than the rest of the group. He made his in-ring debut on January 7, teaming with El Rebelde and El Rebelde's father Hooligan, losing to the team of Dragon Lee, Star Jr., and Starman on a show in Guadalajara, Jalisco, the site of one of CMLL's wrestling schools. A month later Hechicero participated in his first major CMLL event, teaming with one of CMLL's most experienced rudos Último Guerrero to take part in the 2014 Torneo Gran Alternativa ("The Great Alternative Tournament"). In the Gran Alternativa tournament a rookie (in storyline terms) and a veteran team up for a tag team elimination match. The annual Gran Alternativa tournament is used to showcase the younger wrestlers of the team. Hechicero and Star Jr. won an eight-man Battle Royal used to determine the match ups for the first round of the tournament. Hechicero and Guerrero defeated Star Jr. and Atlantis in the first round of the tournament, but were defeated by eventual tournament winners Bárbaro Cavernario and Mr. Niebla in the second round.

Hechicero was one of sixteen wrestlers given a chance to compete in the 2014 En Busca de un Ídolo ("In search of an idol") tournament. The En Busca de un Ídolo tournament featured younger wrestlers, mostly low-to-mid-card wrestlers where they were given an opportunity to showcase their wrestling skills on a national scale. As part of the tournament each wrestler would earn points from the outcome of their matches, feedback from a panel of judges and a weekly online poll. Hechicero was one eight wrestlers to qualify as he survived a Torneo cibernetico elimination match along with Cavernario, Chachorro, Dragon Lee Guerrero Negro, Jr., Soberano Jr., Star Jr., and Super Halcón Jr. Hechicero ended up on the team being coached by Virus each week, with coaching focusing not just on the actual wrestling but also how to play their characters in the ring, interact with the fans and so on. During the weekly judging Hechicero received praise for his in-ring skills but also got several comments on the fact that he did not wrestle a very rudo style and needed to be more aggressive in the ring, something he tried to incorporate from week to week. After the first round Hechicero won almost every single weekly online poll, propelling him to the top of the ranking at the end with a total of 565 points, 114 more than the second place Cavernario. In the week between the first and the second round Hechicero teamed up with Virus and Cachorro to defeat Negro Casas, Cavernario and Dragon Lee on the May 23 Super Viernes show. In the second round Hechicero lost to Cavernario but defeated both Dragon Lee and Cachorro to earn a total of 250 points, including the majority of the online poll votes. The point score qualified Hechicero for the finals against Cavernario. In the final Cavernario defeated Hechicero two falls to one to win the tournament. The following week all eight "Busca" competitors two trainers faced off in a torneo cibernetico elimination match that saw Negro Casas eliminate Virus as the last man to win the match, Hechicero was eliminated as the sixth man by as he and Cavernario pinned each other at the same time. In the weeks following the En Busca de un Ídolo finals Hechicero began teaming with Mephisto and Ephesto for a couple of shows, possibly signaling that CMLL had plans to make them a trio after Mephisto and Ephesto's regular partner Averno had left CMLL. Later when Mephisto and Ephesto were announced as teaming with El Hombre Sin Nombre ("The Man with No Name") there was initial confusion if that meant Hechicero was being given a new ring identify, but once El Hombre Sin Nombre made his debut, it was obvious that the physical appearance and wrestling style did not match Hechicero. On the October 10, 2014 Super Viernes show Hechicero debuted a new look, including a new mask design and trunks in black with gold or red embellishment. As part of his image makeover Hechicero began carrying a bowl that burned with red flames as part of his entrance rituals. At ringside Hechicero often touches and sometimes scoops out the flames from the bowl without hurting his hands.

On December 16, 2014 Hechicero and Bárbaro Cavernario unsuccessfully challenged the team of Delta and Guerrero Maya Jr. for the CMLL Arena Coliseo Tag Team Championship. For the 2015 Torneo Nacional de Parejas Increibles ("National Incredible Pairs Tournament") Hechicero was forced to team up with Ángel de Oro, his rival at the time. The duo lost to the team of Atlantis and Último Guerrero in the first round of the tournament. At the 2015 Homenaje a Dos Leyendas ("Homage to Two Legends") show Hechicero teamed up with Vangelis and Virus to defeat the trio of Blue Panther Jr., The Panther and Stuka Jr. Three months later Hechicero replaced Blue Panther Jr. for one match in the 2015 En Busca de un Ídolo tournament, losing to Delta at Sin Salida ("No Escape") on July 17, 2015.

On October 25, 2016, Hechicero outlasted 11 other wrestlers in a torneo cibernetico elimination match to earn a match for the NWA World Historic Light Heavyweight Championship. The following week Hechicero defeated champion Rey Bucanero to win the championship, the first CMLL championship of his career. A couple of weeks after winning the championship Hechicero was one of sixteen participants in the 2016 Leyenda de Azul ("The Blue Legend") torneo cibernetico elimination match, but was eliminated during the match. On November 27, 2016, he defended the NWA World Historic Light Heavyweight Championship against Caifan. The match took place at the Lucha Memes show Chairo 6, a non-CMLL show.

At 88 Aniversario - Noche de campeones, Hechicero defeated Último Guerrero to win the CMLL World Heavyweight Championship. He held the title for 410 days and defended it two times until he lost it against Gran Guerrero on November 7, 2022.

Outside Mexico (2016–present)
In January 2016, Hechicero made his Japanese debut by taking part in the CMLL and New Japan Pro-Wrestling (NJPW) co-produced Fantastica Mania 2016 tour. Over the six show tour Hechicero competed in various multi-man matches, teaming with both CMLL and NJPW representatives. On the last day of the tour Hechicero, Boby Z, Okumura and Yoshi-Hashi lost to the team of Fuego, Stuka Jr., Kushida and Tiger Mask.

On October 29, 2016, Hechicero made his Ring of Honor (ROH) debut in Baltimore, Maryland where he teamed up with Okumura and Último Guerrero to compete in a tournament to determine the first ever ROH World Six-Man Tag Team Championship. In the first round the CMLL trio defeated The Addiction (Christopher Daniels and Frankie Kazarian) and Kamaitachi, but lost to The Kingdom (Matt Taven, T. K. O'Ryan and Vinny Marseglia) in the semi-finals of the tournament. On December 2, 2016 Hechicero teamed up with Fly Warrior for Promociones Cara Lucha as part of their Torneo Juventud y Gloria  ("Tournament of Youth and Glory") tournament where an established, "Veteran" wrestler, teames up with a rookie, The duo lost to Último Guerrero and Templario in the first round.

In January 2017, Hechicero took part in the Fantastica Mania 2017 tour, unsuccessfully challenging Máximo Sexy for the CMLL World Heavyweight Championship in the main event of the January 21 Fantastica Mania show.

Championships and accomplishments
Consejo Mundial de Lucha Libre
CMLL World Heavyweight Championship (1 time)
NWA World Historic Light Heavyweight Championship (1 time)
Kaoz Lucha Libre
Kaoz Heavyweight Championship (1 time)
Poder Y Honor
PYH Heavyweight Championship (1 time, current)
Pro Wrestling Illustrated
Ranked No. 35 of the top 500 singles wrestlers in the "PWI 500" in 2022
Mexican Independent Promotions
WWA World Middleweight Championship (1 time)

Luchas de Apuestas record

Footnotes

References

Living people
Masked wrestlers
Mexican male professional wrestlers
Sportspeople from Monterrey
Unidentified wrestlers
Year of birth missing (living people)
21st-century professional wrestlers
CMLL World Heavyweight Champions
NWA World Historic Light Heavyweight Champions